MROH8 is a protein in humans that is encoded by the MROH8 gene.

References

External links

Further reading